OVpay is a payment system for public transport in the Netherlands, currently only for journeys at the full OV-chipkaart fare.

With the introduction of the system in mid-2022, it will be possible to check in and out in several ways. National coverage is expected to be achieved in 2023, allowing check-in and check-out via debit and credit cards, as well as mobile devices such as mobile phones and smartwatches. The system is complementary to the OV smart card system. However, it will later be completely replaced by an "OV pass" that can be carried both digitally and physically.

References

Fare collection systems in the Netherlands
Transport in the Netherlands